Beacon Peak is a summit in Alberta, Canada.

Beacon Peak was named for the fact it stood as a landmark or "beacon".

See also 
 List of mountains in the Canadian Rockies

References

Two-thousanders of Alberta
Alberta's Rockies